The Awuna River also called Sakvailak by the Iñupiat  is a  tributary of the Colville River in the U.S. state of Alaska. Located entirely within the National Petroleum Reserve, it arises in a swamp north of Lookout Ridge in the North Slope Borough. It flows generally east to meet the larger river west of Angoyakvik Pass.

Etymology
The river's name Awuna means "westward" or Uwanmun. The name given to the river now by the Iñupiat is Sakvailak.

See also
List of rivers of Alaska

References

Rivers of North Slope Borough, Alaska
Rivers of Alaska